Raymond is an unincorporated community in Springfield Township, Franklin County, Indiana.

History
Raymond was platted in 1903, when the railroad was extended to that point. The town site was previously wetland.

Geography

References

Unincorporated communities in Franklin County, Indiana
Unincorporated communities in Indiana